The 1938 Chico State Wildcats football team represented Chico State College—now known as California State University, Chico—as a member of the Far Western Conference (FWC) during the 1938 college football season. Led by first-year head coach Roy Bohler, Chico State compiled an overall record of 2–5–1 with a mark of 0–2–1 in conference play, tying for fourth place in the FWC. The team was outscored by its opponents 95 to 53 for the season. The Wildcats played home games at College Field in Chico, California.

Schedule

Notes

References

Chico State
Chico State Wildcats football seasons
Chico State Wildcats football